Mexican may refer to:

Mexico and its culture
Being related to, from, or connected to the country of Mexico, in North America
 People 
 Mexicans, inhabitants of the country Mexico and their descendants
 Mexica, ancient indigenous people of the Valley of Mexico
 Being related to the State of Mexico, one of the 32 federal entities of Mexico
 Culture of Mexico
 Mexican cuisine
 historical synonym of Nahuatl, language of the Nahua people (including the Mexica)

Arts and entertainment
 "The Mexican" (short story), by Jack London
 "The Mexican" (song), by the band Babe Ruth
 Regional Mexican, a Latin music radio format

Films
 The Mexican (1918 film), a German silent film
 The Mexican (1955 film), a Soviet film by Vladimir Kaplunovsky based on the Jack London story, starring Georgy Vitsin
 The Mexican, a 2001 American comedy film directed by Gore Verbinski, starring Brad Pitt and Julia Roberts

Other uses
 USS Mexican (ID-1655), United States Navy ship

See also 
 Mexican Empire (disambiguation)
 Mexicano (disambiguation)

Language and nationality disambiguation pages